The FIBA EuroChallenge Final Four MVP, or FIBA EuroChallenge Finals MVP, was the most valuable player award that was presented to the basketball player who most exhibited exceptional play during the FIBA EuroChallenge's Final Four stage, which was the final stage of Europe's former third-tier level European-wide professional club basketball tournament.

Winners
Player nationality by national team.

References

External links
SHULER NAMED FINAL FOUR MVP

FIBA EuroChallenge
European basketball awards
Basketball most valuable player awards

it:EuroChallenge Finals MVP